Abdollah Khan Ustajlu (died 1566/67) was a high-ranking Iranian dignitary of Turkoman origin, who served during the reign of king (shah) Tahmasp I (1524-1576). He successively held the posts of amir al-omarāʾ (commander-in-chief) and divanbegi (chancellor, chief justice), before becoming the governor of Shirvan from 1549 until 1565 or 1566.

Biography
Abdollah Khan was a son of Qara Khan Ustajlu by his wife, a sister of king Ismail I (r. 1501-1524), and was thus a nephew of Shah Ismail. He married a Safavid princess himself as well, a daughter of Ismail I with the name of Pari Khan Khanum. 

In 1549, having already served as amir-al-omarāʾ and divanbegi, he was appointed governor of Shirvan, a post he held for numerous years. in 1562-1563, Abdollah Khan sent envoys to the capital of the Russian Tsardom, Moscow, to conduct discussions about trade. In the 1560s, Abdollah Khan granted the Muscovy Company trading privileges, whose mission to Safavid Iran at the time was led by Anthony Jenkinson. Abdollah Khan's grandson, Salman Khan Ustajlu b. Shah-Qoli Mirza (died 1623-1624), became one of the "highest and richest dignitaries of the state" on his turn.

Notes

References

Sources

  
 
 
 

16th-century deaths
Iranian Turkmen people
Ustajlu
Safavid governors of Shirvan
Safavid governors of Shaki
Commanders-in-chief of Safavid Iran
16th-century people of Safavid Iran